Beatrice Brunnbauer (born 25 March 1992) is an Austrian female deaf alpine skier. She represented Austria at the 2015 Winter Deaflympics and competed in the women's slalom, giant slalom, Super-G, super combined and downhill events.

She claimed bronze medals in the women's giant slalom, Super-G and super combined categories at the 2015 Winter Deaflympics.

References 

1992 births
Living people
Austrian female alpine skiers
Deaf skiers
Austrian deaf people
Deaflympic alpine skiers of Austria
Alpine skiers at the 2015 Winter Deaflympics
Deaflympic bronze medalists for Austria
20th-century Austrian women
21st-century Austrian women